Hyacinthe Marie de Lalande de Calan (26 April 1802 in Quimper – 14 June 1850 in Pondichéry) was Governor General for Inde française in the Second French Colonial Empire under Second Republic.

Titles held

1802 births
1850 deaths
People from Quimper
Governors of French India
People of the French Second Republic
19th-century French politicians